Genetically modified crops are plants used in agriculture, the DNA of which has been modified using genetic engineering techniques.  In most cases, the aim is to introduce a new trait to the plant which does not occur naturally in the species. As of 2015, 26 plant species have been genetically modified and approved for commercial release in at least one country. The majority of these species contain genes that make them either tolerant to herbicides or resistant to insects. Other common traits include virus resistance, delayed ripening, modified flower colour or altered composition. In 2014, 28 countries grew GM crops, and 39 countries imported but did not grow them.

Background

Regulations regarding the commercialisation of genetically modified crops are mostly conducted by individual countries. For cultivation, environmental approval determines whether a crop can be legally grown. Separate approval is generally required to use GM crops in food for human consumption or as animal feed.

GM crops were first planted commercially on a large scale in 1996, in the US, China, Argentina, Canada, Australia, and Mexico. Some countries have approved but not actually cultivated GM crops, due to public uncertainty or further government restrictions, while at the same time, they may import GM foods for consumption. For example, Japan is a leading GM food importer, and permits but has not grown GM food crops. The European Union regulates importation of GM foods, while individual member states determine cultivation. In the US, separate regulatory agencies handle approval for cultivation (USDA, EPA) and for human consumption (FDA).

Two genetically modified crops have been approved for food use in some countries, but have not obtained approval for cultivation. A GM Melon engineered for delayed senescence was approved in 1999 and a herbicide tolerant GM wheat was approved in 2004.

Genetically modified crops cultivated in 2014

In 2014, 181.5 million hectares of genetically modified crops were planted in 28 countries. Half of all GM crops planted were genetically modified soybeans, either for herbicide tolerance or insect resistance. Eleven countries grew modified soybean, with the USA, Brazil and Argentina accounting for 90% of the total hectarage. Of the 111 hectares of soybean grown worldwide in 2014, 82% was genetically modified in some way. Seventeen countries grew a total of 55.2 million hectares of genetically modified maize and fifteen grew 23.9 hectares of genetically modified cotton. Nine million hectares of genetically modified canola was grown with 8 million of those in Canada. Other GM crops grown in 2014 include Alfalfa (862 000 ha), sugar beet (494 000 ha) and papaya (7 475 ha). In Bangladesh a genetically modified eggplant was grown commercially for the first time on 12ha.

The majority of GM crops have been modified to be resistant to selected herbicides, usually a glyphosate or glufosinate based one. In 2014, 154 million hectares were planted with a herbicide resistant crop and 78.8 million hectares had insect resistant. This include 51.4 million hectares planted in thirteen countries that contained both herbicide tolerance and insect resistance. Less than one million hectares contained other traits, which include providing virus resistance, delaying senescence, modifying flower colour and altering the plants composition. Drought tolerant maize was planted for just the second year in the USA on 275 000 hectares.

Herbicide tolerance 

Genetically modified crops engineered to resist herbicides are now more available than conventionally bred resistant varieties. They comprised 83% of the total GM crop area, equating to just under 8% of the arable land worldwide. Approval has been granted to grow crops engineered to be resistant to the herbicides 2,4-dichlorophenoxyacetic acid, dicamba, glufosinate glyphosate, sulfonylurea, oxynil mesotrione and isoxaflutole Most herbicide resistant GM crops have been engineered for glyphosate tolerance, in the USA 93% of soybeans and most of the GM maize grown is glyphosate tolerant.

Insect resistance
Most currently available genes used to engineer insect resistance come from the Bacillus thuringiensis bacterium. Most are in the form of delta endotoxin genes known as cry proteins, while a few use the genes that encode for vegetative insecticidal proteins. Insect resistant crops target various species of coleopteran (beetles) and lepidopteran (moths). The only gene commercially used to provide insect protection that does not originate from B. thuringiensis is the Cowpea trypsin inhibitor (CpTI). CpTI was first approved for use cotton in 1999 and is currently undergoing trials in rice.

Stacked traits
Many varieties of GM crops contain more than one resistance gene. This could be in the form of multiple insect resistant genes, multiple herbicide tolerance genes or a combination of the herbicide and insect resistant genes. Smartstax is a brand of GM maize that has eight different genes added to it, making it resistant to two types of herbicides and toxic to six different species of insects.

Other modified traits
While most crops are engineered to resist insects or tolerate herbicides some crops have been developed for other traits. Flowers have been engineered to display colours that they cannot do so naturally (in particular the blue color in roses). A few crops, like the genetically modified papaya, are engineered to resist viruses. Other modifications alter the plants composition, with the aim of making it more nutritious, longer lasting or more industrially useful. Recently crops engineered to tolerate drought have been commercialised.

Genetically modified crops that are no longer cultivated

Approved genetically modified crops that have not yet been cultivated

Genetically modified crops by country 

The following graph shows the area planted in GM crops in the five largest GM crop producing countries. The area planted is presented along the y axis in thousands of hectares while the year is along the x axis.

See also
 AquAdvantage salmon

References and notes

Notes

References

Genetically modified crops
Biotechnology
Genetically modified organisms in agriculture
Genetically modified organisms